De-Kastri Oil Terminal is an oil export terminal located  away from the village of De-Kastri in Khabarovsk Krai, Russian Federation.  It is one of the biggest oil terminals in the Far East that serves as a hub for crude oil deliveries to Asian markets. The terminal which started operations in 2006 belongs to the Sakhalin-I consortium led by Exxon Neftegas Ltd which also includes 20% stake held by Russian affiliates of Rosneft: Sakhalinmorneftegas-Shelf and RN-Astra.
The five Aframax tankers servicing the terminal are purpose-designed double-hull ice class vessels. The area of the terminal covers nearly 

The construction of the terminal started in 2003 and was completed by August 2006. Construction subcontractors included Russian-Turkish joint venture, Enka-Technstroiexport and Russian companies Koksokhimmontazh and Dalmorstroi.

Awards
In November 2009, during the IV International congress Oil Terminal 2009 held in Saint Petersburg, De-Kastri terminal won the Terminal of the Year award. The award Terminal of the Year with capacity of shipment of more than 5 million tonnes per year is presented to an international terminal with best economic, ecological and social indicators once in every three years. De-Kastri terminal was nominated among the total of 34 candidates. Since 2006, nearly 300 oil tankers have transported more than 30 million tonnes of crude oil from the terminal without a single incident. De-Kastri's SBM loading is considered to be the largest in the industry.

See also

Exxon Neftegas Limited
Sakhalin-I
Sakhalin

References

Ports and harbours of the Russian Pacific Coast
Oil terminals
Petroleum industry in Russia
Fuels infrastructure in Russia
ExxonMobil buildings and structures
Rosneft
2006 establishments in Russia